Terry Porter (born August 11, 1954) is an American sound engineer. He was nominated for four Academy Awards in the category Best Sound. He has worked on more than 200 films since 1980.

Selected filmography 

 Star Trek IV: The Voyage Home (1986)
 Good Morning, Vietnam (1987)
 Rain Man (1988)
 The Little Mermaid (1989)
 Fantasia (1990 restoration)
 The Rescuers Down Under (1990)
 Beauty and the Beast (1991)
 Aladdin (1992)
 Homeward Bound: The Incredible Journey (1993)
 The Three Musketeers (1993)
 The Lion King (1994)
 Houseguest (1995)
 A Pyromaniac's Love Story (1995)
 Pocahontas (1995)
 Operation Dumbo Drop (1995)
 Father of the Bride Part II (1995)
 Mr. Holland's Opus (1995)
 Homeward Bound II: Lost in San Francisco (1996)
 Eddie (1996)
 The Hunchback of Notre Dame (1996)
 2 Days in the Valley (1996)
 101 Dalmatians (1996)
 Metro (1997)
 Anna Karenina (1997)
 George of the Jungle (1997)
 Rocket Man (1997)
 Flubber (1997)
 Mr. Magoo (1997)
 Mulan (1998)
 Holy Man (1998)
 10 Things I Hate About You (1999)
 Instinct (1999)
 Inspector Gadget (1999)
 Teaching Mrs. Tingle (1999)
 Music of the Heart (1999)
 Dinosaur (2000)
 Disney's The Kid (2000)
 The Emperor's New Groove (2000)
 The Majestic (2001)
 Lilo & Stitch (2002)
 The Santa Clause 2 (2002)
 Treasure Planet (2002)
 Home on the Range (2004)
 Coach Carter (2005)
 The Chronicles of Narnia: The Lion, the Witch and the Wardrobe (2005)
 The Santa Clause 3: The Escape Clause (2006)

References

External links 
 

1954 births
Living people
American audio engineers
People from Glendale, California
Emmy Award winners
Engineers from California
Walt Disney Animation Studios people